Widows' Web is a 2022 Philippine television drama crime series broadcast by GMA Network. Directed by Jerry Lopez Sineneng, it stars Carmina Villarroel, Vaness del Moral, Ashley Ortega and Pauline Mendoza. It premiered on February 28, 2022 on the network's Telebabad line up replacing Mano Po Legacy: The Family Fortune. The series concluded on April 29, 2022 with a total of 43 episodes. It was replaced by False Positive in its timeslot.

The series is streaming online on YouTube.

Cast and characters
Lead cast
 Carmina Villarroel as Barbara Sagrado-Dee
 Vaness del Moral as Hillary Pelaez-Suarez
 Ashley Ortega as Jacqueline "Jackie" Antonio-Sagrado / Tisay
 Pauline Mendoza as Elaine Innocencio-Querubin

Supporting cast
 Neil Coleta as Julius Collado
 Adrian Alandy as Vladimir "Vlad" Mabantog Sagrado
 Edgar Allan Guzman as Frank Querubin
 Christian Vasquez as Boris Tayuman
 Bernard Palanca as William Suarez
 Dave Bornea as Dwight de Guzman
 Mosang as Delia Gonzales
 Allan Paule as Ramon Innocencio
 Arthur Solinap as Emil Bañez
 Tanya Gomez as Gloria Querubin
 Karenina Haniel as Rose Punzalan
 Anjay Anson as Jed Sagrado Dee
 Vanessa Peña as Nikki Suarez
 Mike Agassi as George Aguirre
 Josh Ivan Morales as Simon Barcial

Guest cast
 Ryan Eigenmann as Alexander "Xander" Sagrado III

Episodes
<onlyinclude>
<onlyinclude>

References

External links
 
 

2022 Philippine television series debuts
2022 Philippine television series endings
Fiction about murder
Filipino-language television shows
GMA Network drama series
Murder in television
Philippine crime television series
Television shows set in the Philippines